Bishnoi or Vishnoi is a Hindic surname that may refer to
Bhajan Lal Bishnoi (1930–2011), Indian politician
Bhavya Bishnoi (born 1993), Indian politician
Bihari Lal Bishnoi (born 1979), Indian politician
Chaitanya Bishnoi (born 1994), Indian cricketer
Jagdish Bishnoi (born 1972), Indian javelin thrower
Jaswant Singh Bishnoi (born 1958), Indian politician
Khamu Ram Bishnoi (born 1966), Indian environmental activist
Kishna Ram Vishnoi (born 1965), Indian politician
Kiran Bishnoi, Indian freestyle wrestler 
Kripa Shankar Patel Bishnoi (born 1977), Indian professional wrestler and coach 
Kuldeep Bishnoi (born 1968), Indian politician
 Lawrence Bishnoi, Indian Gangster
Mahendra Bishnoi (born 1981), Indian politician
Malkhan Singh Bishnoi, Indian politician
Pabba Ram Bishnoi (1951), Indian politician
Poonam Chand Vishnoi, Indian politician
Rajesh Bishnoi (born 1987), Indian cricketer
Rajesh Bishnoi (cricketer, born 1990), Indian cricketer
Ram Narayan Bishnoi (1932–2012), Indian politician
Ram Singh Bishnoi, Indian politician
Raman Bishnoi (born 1997), Indian cricketer
Ranaram Bishnoi, Indian environmentalist 
Ravi Bishnoi (born 2000), Indian cricketer
Renuka Bishnoi, Indian politician
Salil Vishnoi (born 1955), Indian politician
Shweta Bishnoi (born 1992), Indian cricketer
Sukhram Bishnoi (born 1953), Indian politician